Flood is the fourth album by the Canadian singer-songwriter Jeremy Fisher. It was released on October 25, 2010, by Aquarius Records.

Production
The album was demoed using a drum machine.

Critical reception
AllMusic wrote that the album "continued Fisher's increasing trend toward hooky, upbeat melodic pop." The Province called it "warm, folky pop with elements of reggae and world music."

Track listing
 "Shine a Little Light" – 3:11
 "Naked Girl" – 3:21
 "Laissez Faire" – 3:05
 "Come Fly Away" – 3:09
 "Nothing to Lose" – 4:05
 "Alison" – 2:50
 "Morning's Broke" — 2:55
 "On a Monday" – 3:46
 "Summer Rain" – 4:09
 "Umbrella" – 3:44
 "All We Want Is Love" – 4:18

Personnel 
 Jeremy Fisher 
 Howard Redekopp – mixer
 Jarett Holmes - assistant engineer

References

Jeremy Fisher albums
2010 albums
Aquarius Records (Canada) albums